McNiece, MacNiece, and variants, is a surname.

People with this name include:

 Ben McNiece (born 1992) Australian-rules football player
 Jake McNiece (1919–2013) WWII U.S. Army paratrooper, member of the Filthy Thirteen

See also